A smear campaign, also referred to as a smear tactic or simply a smear, is an effort to damage or call into question someone's reputation, by propounding negative propaganda. It makes use of discrediting tactics.

It can be applied to individuals or groups. Common targets are public officials, politicians, political candidates, activists, and ex-spouses. The term also applies in other contexts, such as the workplace.

The term smear campaign became popular around 1936.

Definition

A smear campaign is an intentional, premeditated effort to undermine an individual's or group's reputation, credibility, and character. Like negative campaigning, most often smear campaigns target government officials, politicians, political candidates, and other public figures. However, private persons or groups may also become targets of smear campaigns perpetrated in companies, institutions, the legal system, and other formal groups. Discrediting tactics are used to discourage people from believing in the figure or supporting their cause, such as the use of damaging quotations.

Smear tactics differ from normal discourse or debate in that they do not bear upon the issues or arguments in question. A smear is a simple attempt to malign a group or an individual with the aim of undermining their credibility.

Smears often consist of ad hominem attacks in the form of unverifiable rumors and distortions, half-truths, or even outright lies; smear campaigns are often propagated by gossip magazines. Even when the facts behind a smear campaign are demonstrated to lack proper foundation, the tactic is often effective because the target's reputation is tarnished before the truth is known.

Smear campaigns can also be used as a campaign tactic associated with tabloid journalism, which is a type of journalism that presents little well-researched news and instead uses eye-catching headlines, scandal-mongering and sensationalism.  For example, during Gary Hart's 1988 presidential campaign (see below), the New York Post reported on its front page big, black block letters: "GARY: I'M NO WOMANIZER."

Smears are also effective in diverting attention away from the matter in question and onto a specific individual or group. The target of the smear typically must focus on correcting the false information rather than on the original issue.

Deflection has been described as a wrap-up smear: "You make up something. Then you have the press write about it. And then you say, everybody is writing about this charge".

In politics 
Political debate often abuses public confidence by one candidate attempting to sway voters, not by logical argument on given issues, but by personal diatribe that does not directly bear on the matter at hand.

Accusations of adultery in America date back to the 19th century. One famous example of this was the 1884 presidential campaign, in which Grover Cleveland's opponents accused him of having fathered an illegitimate child. A political catchphrase by his opponents was "Ma, ma, where's my pa?" After Cleveland was elected, his supporters mockingly added, "Gone to the White House, ha, ha, ha." Cleveland's defeat of his chief opponent, James G. Blaine, may have been helped by another discrediting tactic used against him which seriously backfired, namely the assertion that Cleveland's party was that of "Rum, Romanism, and Rebellion" (the latter two referring to Roman Catholicism and the American Civil War). Cleveland's campaign also used the slogan, "Blaine, Blaine, James G. Blaine, The Continental Liar from the State of Maine" in reference to Blaine's discredited railroad deals.

Discrediting tactics are not just used against each other by opponents for office in democratic countries, but are also used in wartime between countries. In the middle of the 20th century, Soviet and British propaganda made popular the idea that Adolf Hitler had only one testicle (and was thereby less of a man).

American politics draws a line between "mud slinging" and defamation. The key issue is that mud slinging is not a form of perjury or libel. Politics also can include barratry where one opponent files frivolous litigation against the other, specifically to injure the opponent's reputation even though the case is groundless and may later be dismissed. By the time these facts can come to light, the voters have cast their ballots.

In court cases 
In the U.S. judicial system, discrediting tactics (called witness impeachment) are the approved method for attacking the credibility of any witness in court, including a plaintiff or defendant. In cases with significant mass media attention or high-stakes outcomes, those tactics often take place in public as well.

Logically, an argument is held in discredit if the underlying premise is found, "So severely in error that there is cause to remove the argument from the proceedings because of its prejudicial context and application...". Mistrial proceedings in civil and criminal courts do not always require that an argument brought by defense or prosecution be discredited, however appellate courts must consider the context and may discredit testimony as perjurious or prejudicial, even if the statement is technically true.

Moral, psychological and legal considerations
Smear campaigns are considered by many to be a low, disingenuous form of discourse; they have been identified as a common weapon of psychopaths, borderlines, and narcissists.

In many countries, the law recognizes the value of reputation and credibility. Both libel (a false and damaging publication) and slander (a false and damaging oral statement) are often punishable by law and may result in imprisonment or compensation or fees for damages done.

Targets
Smear tactics are commonly used to undermine effective arguments or critiques.

John C. Frémont – 1856 US presidential election candidate

During the 1856 presidential election, John C. Frémont was the target of a smear campaign alleging that he was a Catholic.  The campaign was designed to undermine support for Fremont from those who were suspicious of Catholics.

General Motors against Ralph Nader
Ralph Nader was the victim of a smear campaign during the 1960s, when he was campaigning for car safety. In order to smear Nader and deflect public attention from his campaign, General Motors engaged private investigators to search for damaging or embarrassing incidents from his past. In early March 1966, several media outlets, including The New Republic and The New York Times, reported that GM had tried to discredit Nader, hiring private detectives to tap his phones and investigate his past and hiring prostitutes to trap him in compromising situations. Nader sued the company for invasion of privacy and settled the case for $284,000. Nader's lawsuit against GM was ultimately decided by the New York Court of Appeals, whose opinion in the case expanded tort law to cover "overzealous surveillance." Nader used the proceeds from the lawsuit to start the pro-consumer Center for Study of Responsive Law.

Gary Hart – 1988 US presidential candidate

Gary Hart was the target of a smear campaign during the 1988 US presidential campaign. The New York Post once reported on its front page big, black block letters: "GARY: I'M NO WOMANIZER."

China against Apple Inc.
In 2011, China launched a smear campaign against Apple, including TV and radio advertisements and articles in state-run papers.  The campaign failed to turn the Chinese public against the company and its products.

Sathya Sai Baba
Spiritual leader Sathya Sai Baba was accused of fraud, sexual abuse and other misconduct.  Baba described the allegations as a "smear campaign".  He never faced any investigation and the critics were criticized for lacking any proof against him.

Julian Assange

The allegations against Julian Assange have been labelled by Australian journalist John Pilger as a smear campaign.

Chris Bryant
Chris Bryant, a British parliamentarian, accused Russia in 2012 of orchestrating a smear campaign against him because of his criticism of Vladimir Putin. In 2017 he alleged that other British officials are vulnerable to Russian smear campaigns.

Other examples
In January 2007, it was revealed that an anonymous website that attacked critics of Overstock.com, including media figures and private citizens on message boards, was operated by an official of Overstock.com.

Countries, particularly those outside the Western hemisphere, have accused Western powers of smear campaigns to bring down their governments. Gambia accused the United States and Britain of backing "so-called Gambians to set up organisations and media facilities to spread nothing but lies against The Gambia by making false, outrageous and unfounded statements about the state of human rights."

See also 

 Attack ad
 Bullying
 Borking
 Cancel culture
 Character assassination
 Deception
 Destabilisation
 Doxing
 Idealization and devaluation
 Kompromat
 Minimisation (psychology), also known as "discounting"
 Mudslinging
 Noisy investigation
 Manipulation (psychology)
 Red herring
 Red-baiting
 Setting up to fail
 Shame campaign
 Social undermining
 Swift boating
 Tone policing
 Tu quoque
 Whispering campaign
 Zersetzung

References

Political campaign techniques
Ethically disputed political practices
Narcissism
Tactics
Abuse
Media bias
Media manipulation
Tabloid journalism
Harassment
Reputation management
Deception